Rohan Candappa is a British-born-Sri Lankan-Canadian writer.

Biography
Candappa grew up in London as a second generation immigrant.  His father was originally from Ceylon and his mother from Burma.

After 15 years in advertising, Rohan wrote The Little Book of Stress, which sold over 140,000 copies.  He has since written a number of other books, including The Curious Incident of the WMD in Iraq, Rules Britannia, and 'Picklehead' and has also written two short films for the BBC. He has sold over 1 million books.

He lives in Crouch End, North London with his wife and two children. Cooks excellent food is inspiration to the world has first hand experience with writing.

Rohan has also performed at both the Edinburgh Festival Fringe, the Crouch End Festival (UK's biggest community arts festival) and performed his writings with improvised jazz musicians at üF-Beat.

After being made redundant in 2015, Rohan turned the experience into his first spoken word show, How I Said 'F**k You' to the Company When They Tried to Make Me Redundant, which he performed at the Edinburgh Festival Fringe in 2016.

In March 2020, during the pandemic, he set up the Lockdown Theatre Company online to support, nurture and pay actors left struggling when the theatres closed. He produced over 20 episodes featuring a wide range of actors.

Bibliography
 
 The Stocking Filler: A Modern Fable For Christmas (1998)
 
 
 Stress For Success: The New Mismanagement Revolution (2001)
 
 
 
 
 The Little Book Of Christmas Stress (2003)
 
 Retox Diet (2004)

References

1962 births
Living people
English writers
English people of Burmese descent
English people of Sri Lankan Tamil descent
Writers from London